Carl Wilhelm Cederhielm (17051769) was a Freiherr and Chamberlain (kammarherre) in Sweden. His father was the royal adviser (riksråd) Josias Cederhielm, and his mother was Anna Åkerhielm.

Cederhielm is perhaps best remembered today as a founding member of the Royal Swedish Academy of Sciences, which was founded 1739.

References 

Swedish nobility
Members of the Royal Swedish Academy of Sciences
1705 births
1769 deaths